Sorry for the Delay is a limited-release EP by American indie rock band Grizzly Bear, released on April 9, 2006 on Audraglint. Described as "seven (early) songs of sad, lo-fi pop," the EP consists of material recorded by founding member Ed Droste.

The track "Owner of a Lonely Heart" is a cover of the Yes song.

Track listing
All songs written by Ed Droste except where noted.
 "Sorry for the Delay" – 3:29
 "Sure Thing" – 6:49
 "A Leader Always Carries a Stick" – 4:10
 "Particular to What?" – 4:38
 "August March" – 3:15
 "Owner of a Lonely Heart" (Trevor Rabin/Jon Anderson/Chris Squire/Trevor Horn) – 3:10
 "Fragments" – 2:36

Personnel
 Ed Droste - vocals, acoustic guitar, electric guitar, keyboards, drums, percussion
 Christopher Bear - drums

References

2006 albums
Grizzly Bear (band) albums